The 2022 Tour of Slovenia was 28th edition of the Tour of Slovenia stage race scheduled between 15 and 19 June 2022. The 2.Pro-category race is a part of the UCI ProSeries. Tour was participated by defending Tour de France and Tour of Slovenia winner Tadej Pogačar and Matej Mohorič, first and sixth by UCI Men's road racing world ranking list (as of 15 June 2022).

Pogačar with his teammate Rafał Majka controlled the race and especially all of the climbs. The only other rider who was competitive in the ascents was Matej Mohorič.
Total sum of prizes was €70,975 . Tour attracted around 300,000 people who were watching the race by the road.

Teams 

Four UCI WorldTeams, seven UCI ProTeams, nine UCI Continental teams, and the Slovenian national team made up the twenty-one teams that participated in the race with 144 starters.

UCI WorldTeams

 
 
 
 

UCI ProTeams

 
 
 
 
 
 
 

UCI Continental Teams

 
 
 
 
 
 
 
   
 

National Teams

 Slovenia

Route

Stages

Stage 1 
15 June 2022 – Nova Gorica to Postojna,

Stage 2 
16 June 2022 – Ptuj to Rogaška Slatina, 

Ackermann and Merlier were both dropped but Ackermann was able to rejoin the peloton before the finish. Stage was won by Dylan Groenewegen with help of lead-out sprinter Luka Mezgec.

Stage 3 
17 June 2022 – Žalec to Celje,

Stage 4 
18 June 2022 – Laško to Velika Planina, 

Mountain stage with two Cat.3 climbs (Jesenovo; 2.8 km at 6.9%, Trojane; 2.4 km at 8.2%), one Cat.2 climb (Črnivec; 10.6 km at 5.7%) and one Cat.1 climb (Velika Planina; 8.2 km at 7.6%) showed utter dominance by Rafał Majka and Tadej Pogačar (both ) where winner was solved with Rock paper scissors hand game before the finish line.

Stage 5 
19 June 2022 – Vrhnika to Novo Mesto,

Classification leadership table

Classification standings

General classification

Points classification

Mountains classification

Young rider classification

Team classification

UCI point ranking

References

Notations

External links 

 
 procyclingstats.com

2022
Tour of Slovenia
Tour of Slovenia
Tour of Slovenia
Tour of Slovenia